Mihai Lămboiu (born 25 July 1997) is a Romanian rugby union player. He plays as a wing for professional SuperLiga club Știința Baia Mare. He can also play as a centre.

Club career
Mihai Lămboiu started playing rugby as a youth for a local Romanian club based in Mangalia, A.C.S. Litoral. After just one year and a half he was signed by Divizia Națională side, ACS Tomitanii Constanța. In 2016 he was signed by SuperLiga side, Știința Baia Mare, where he still plays.

International career
Lămboiu is also selected for Romania's national team, the Oaks, making his international debut in a test match against the Los Cóndores on 8 June 2019.

References

External links
 
 
 

1997 births
Living people
People from Mangalia
Romanian rugby union players
Romania international rugby union players
ACS Tomitanii Constanța players
CSM Știința Baia Mare players
Rugby union centres
Rugby union wings